Francois 'Faffa' Knoetze  (born 18 January 1963) is a former South African rugby union player that played two tests for the Springboks.

Playing career
After finishing school, Knoetze furthered his studies at Stellenbosch University. At university he played for the Maties under–20 side and was selected for the Western Province under–20 team and the South Africa Universities under–20 team. His first match for the Western Province senior team was in 1984 against South Western Districts. Knoetze was part of the Western Province team that won the Currie Cup in 1985 and in 1986. He played 110 matches for Western Province, scoring 43 tries.

Knoetze made his test debut for the Springboks against the World XV on 26 August 1989 at his home ground, Newlands in Cape Town. He also played in the second test against the World XV and toured with the Springboks to England and France in 1992. He played in six tour matches for the Springboks and scored two tries.

Test history

Accolades
In 1985, Knoetze was one of the five Young Players of the Year, along with Schalk Burger (born 1963), Deon Coetzee, Christo Ferreira and Giepie Nel.

See also
List of South Africa national rugby union players – Springbok no. 553

References

1963 births
Living people
South African rugby union players
South Africa international rugby union players
Western Province (rugby union) players
Rugby union players from Cape Town
Rugby union centres